Bhatauli is an Indian village of Kanpur Dehat district in Uttar Pradesh.It is an adjacent to city Rura, Kanpur Dehat District, Uttar Pradesh, India. Bhatauli is the commercial center of grain and vegetables. It is well known place for potatoes cold storage. Many primary schools are in government sector while many others in private (recognized). Saraswati Gyan Mandir Inter College is also here. Jog Mai (Durga Mandir) is a center of faith.

Transport
It is connected with city Rura Railway Station (NCR) at distance 400 m. Rura is a main Railway Station of Kanpur Dehat District. It is connected with fast &super fast trains to Kanpur, Lucknow, Hawrah Delhi, Dehradoon, Meerut etc.
It is linked with Golden Quadrilateral National High Way of India at Mugisapur & Akbarpur at a distances 18 km & 14 km. Akbarpur-Derapur Road (via Rura) passes through the middle of the town. Following main trains are available:

Gomti Express.
Agra-Lucknow Intercity Express.
Toofan Express
Anand Bihar-Kolkata Express.
Mahananda Express.
Rourkela/Jammu Tawi Muri Express
Unchahar Express.
Sangam Express.

Geography
It has an average elevation of 127 metres (416 feet).

Demographics
 India
Area map

Gallery 
.

References

Villages in Kanpur Dehat district